Percival Stacy Waddy (8 January 1875 – 8 February 1937) was an Australian schoolmaster, clergyman and cricketer.

Life
Waddy was born at Carcoar, New South Wales, on 8 January 1875. He was the son of Richard A. Waddy, bank-manager and his wife, a daughter of Dr Stacy, botanist, a woman of ability, charm and force of character. Waddy's paternal grandfather was a general in the British army. Soon after Waddy's birth the family removed to Morpeth, New South Wales on the Hunter River. Going first to the East Maitland Grammar School, Waddy in 1890 went on to his father's old school, The King's School, Parramatta, New South Wales, where he became captain of the school and of the cricket and football teams, won several prizes, and was awarded the Broughton and Forrest scholarships of £100 a year. With Dick Manchee, he played cricket for 'Twenty of Cumberland and District' against Lord Sheffield's visiting English team in December 1891.

In the summer vacation of 1893 he entered at Balliol College, Oxford. He played in the Oxford eleven for two years, read law intending to become a barrister, but in his third year decided to enter the ministry. He took a second class in classical moderations and in jurisprudence and graduated B.A. in 1897, M.A. in 1901; After experience in the east end of London at Oxford House, he was ordained deacon in 1898 and priest in 1899. He was a curate at Bethnal Green from 1898 to 1900, and in December 1900 returned to Australia. 

From that time he dropped his first name and was always known as Stacy Waddy. After acting for a short period as curate to Bishop Stretch at Newcastle, New South Wales, he was given the difficult parish of Stockton, New South Wales on the other side of the harbour, then much overloaded with debt. Waddy tackled his task with enthusiasm, wrote his first book, a short one on confirmation, Come for Strength, published in London in 1904, and by the middle of the same year had succeeded in paying off the parish debts. His energy was boundless, as in this year he wrote various tracts, gave over 40 lantern lecture averaged over six services a Sunday in his own parish, travelling about 30 miles on his bicycle, became bishop's chaplain and secretary of the clerical society, and also managed to fit in some very successful cricket. In December 1903 at West Maitland against Plum Warner's English eleven which included such well-known bowlers as Hurst, Len Braund, Ted Arnold, Bernard Bosanquet and Fielder, he made 93 and 102. Had he accepted the suggestion that he should get a position in Sydney and play cricket, it is likely that he would have gained a place in the New South Wales eleven.

In 1907 Waddy was asked to apply for the head mastership of his old school, The King's School, Parramatta. He did not want to leave his parish work, he had had no experience or training in teaching, but he was told that the need for him was great and he gave way. He was a success from the first day of his appointment, the number of boys at the school increased very much, the house system was introduced, and a preparatory school was started. Sport was given its due place and its standard went up immensely, scholarship was not neglected, and Waddy took the beginners for classics so that the boys might realize from the start that Latin and Greek need not be dull subjects; but all the time character-building was treated as the most important part of school life. 

In 1913 he had a temporary break-down partly from over-work, went to England on six months' leave, and soon after World War I broke out in August 1914, acted as a chaplain at the Liverpool camp. He applied for a year's leave of absence from his school to go to the front in 1916, but the council of the school would not grant it, and Waddy with much regret resigned and said good-bye to the school at the prizegiving on 16 June. He sailed on 22 August, and whether on a troopship, in camp in England, at the front in France or in Palestine, had the same understanding comradeship with the men as he had had with the boys of his school. He was invalided home to Australia in July 1918 and arrived in September. Soon afterwards he was offered a canonry of St. George's Cathedral, Jerusalem, as Archdeacon for Palestine, Syria and Trans-Jordan then he was in charge of re-organizing the education work of the Anglican Church there. He was at Jerusalem for over five years, and in July 1924 was appointed secretary of the Society for the Propagation of the Gospel in Foreign Parts. As archdeacon he was succeeded by Weston Henry Stewart, who became Bishop of Jerusalem in 1943.  

When Waddy began his new work in England he was nearly 50 years of age, but his energy was undiminished though he had had an operation shortly before leaving Palestine. He did an enormous amount of work both at his office and after hours at home, and made many journeys to South Africa, Canada, the Far East, the United States, India and West Africa. On his way home from West Africa he fell ill of malaria in January and died in hospital in England on 8 February 1937. 

In 1901 he married Etheldred Spittal, daughter of the Rev. John Spittal, and granddaughter of Sir James Spittal, Lord Provost of Edinburgh. She survived him with two daughters and three sons, including their son Bernard. It was a marriage of great happiness. Waddy was made an honorary canon of Peterborough Cathedral in 1931. He published in 1913 The Great Moghul, and in 1928 Homes of the Psalms.

Waddy was over six feet in height, athletic in body, frank in manner, humorous and understanding. He was a good organizer, a somewhat forceful administrator, yet modest, and completely sincere in his piety. He was a good preacher with a fine voice and as a clergyman in a coalmining district, as head of a great school, as chaplain in the army, or secretary of a great missionary organization, was equally successful; he was a force for good, an abiding influence on all associated with him.

External links
K. J. Cable, 'Waddy, Percival Stacy (1875 - 1937)', Australian Dictionary of Biography, Volume 12, Melbourne University Press, 1990, p. 338.
Stacy Waddy cricketing information at cricinfo.
A Visit to Norfolk Island, by Stacy Waddy (1906)

References

G. P. Walsh, 'Manchee, Arthur Frederick (Dick) (1874 - 1956)', Australian Dictionary of Biography, Volume 15, Melbourne University Press, 2000, pp 293-294.

1875 births
1937 deaths
20th-century Australian Anglican priests
Alumni of Balliol College, Oxford
Australian cricketers
Australian schoolteachers
Oxford University cricketers